Eduardo Davino (August 6, 1929 – January 20, 2011) was the Roman Catholic bishop of the Roman Catholic Diocese of Palestrina, Italy.

Ordained to the priesthood in 1952, he was ordained a bishop in 1993. Davino was appointed bishop of the Palestrina Diocese in 1997 and retired in 2005  Bishop Dabino died on January 20, 2011.

Notes

Bishops in Lazio
People from the Metropolitan City of Rome Capital
1929 births
2011 deaths